Avery Anderson (born 1997) is an American politician serving as a member of the Kansas House of Representatives from the 72nd district. Elected in November 2020, he assumed office on January 11, 2021.

Early life and education 
A native of Newton, Kansas, Anderson earned a Bachelor of Science degree in political science and government from the University of Kansas in 2019.

Career 
In 2018, Anderson worked as an intern in the Kansas Legislature. In the summer of 2019, he interned in the Sedgwick County District Attorney's Office. From January to May 2020, Anderson served as an intern in the U.S. Senate office of Pat Roberts.

2021-2022 Kansas House of Representatives Committee Assignments
Financial Institutions and Rural Development
General Government Budget
Commerce, Labor and Economic Development
Energy, Utilities and Telecommunications

References 

Living people
1997 births
University of Kansas alumni
Republican Party members of the Kansas House of Representatives
People from Newton, Kansas
21st-century American politicians